Journal to Eliza is a work by British author Laurence Sterne. It was published posthumously in 1904.

Sterne wrote it in the summer of 1767 as he neared the end of his life. At that time he was also writing A Sentimental Journey through France and Italy, where the 'little picture of Eliza' that Yorick wears around his neck is mentioned at the outset.

The journal is in the form of a diary-cum-letter and was inspired by his deep affection for Mrs. Elizabeth Draper whom he had met when she visited England in 1765–1767. She was the 22 year old wife of an East India Company official and sister of Rawson Hart Boddam. Her husband had brought her to recuperate from illness. Given both parties were already married, the relationship was regarded as scandalous.

The author adopts the pseudonym Parson Yorick, who previously appeared in his two best known novels, The Life and Opinions of Tristram Shandy, Gentleman and A Sentimental Journey through France and Italy. In Tristram Shandy we are told that the parson is related to the famous, fictional jester Yorick whose skull is disinterred in Shakespeare's Hamlet:

"It has often come into my head, that this post could be no other than that of the king’s chief Jester;—and that Hamlet’s Yorick, in our Shakespear, many of whose plays, you know, are founded upon authenticated facts,—was certainly the very man."

In a second example of the author's playfulness with names, Sterne and Eliza receive the pet names ‘Bramin’ and ‘Bramine’ throughout. Given the Brahmin Hindu priestly caste is renowned for austerity and wisdom, Sterne thereby draws attention to his real-life role as a priest. Simultaneously, Eliza's epithet Bramine highlights her connections with India.

This playful religious name-calling serves to remind us that Sterne was an Anglican clergyman. Remembered now for his fiction, in his day more copies of his Sermons were published than of his novels.

There is characteristically Sternian ambiguity in the Journal concerning whether it was written as a private extended love letter to Elizabeth Draper, or was intended for publication as literature. It appears to be both autobiographical and an imaginative work of fiction, and Sterne says he is writing for posterity:

"...when You and I are at rest for ever— Some Annotator or explainer of my works in this place will take occasion, to speak of the Friendship which Subsisted so long and faithfully betwixt Yorick and the Lady he speaks of."

References 

1767 books